New Directions in Europe is a live album by Jack DeJohnette featuring trumpeter Lester Bowie, guitarist John Abercrombie and bassist Eddie Gómez recorded in 1979 and released on the ECM label in 1980.

Reception 
"This group demonstrates what an extraordinary and exiting player DeJohnette can be," wrote Richard Cook and Brian Morton in their Penguin Guide to Jazz Recordings, "he never sounded as convincing in the studio – or at least under his own name. [...] though Abercrombie sounds oddly out of condition." The Allmusic review by Scott Yanow states, "There are some colorful moments but overall the music is not all that memorable".

Track listing 
All compositions by Jack DeJohnette except as indicated
 "Salsa for Eddie G." - 16:05
 "Where or Wayne" - 12:33
 "Bayou Fever" - 18:24
 "Multo Spiliagio" (Abercrombie, Bowie, DeJohnette, Gomez) - 9:33

Personnel 
 Jack DeJohnette: drums, piano
 Lester Bowie: trumpet
 John Abercrombie: guitar, mandolin guitar
 Eddie Gómez: bass

References 

Jack DeJohnette live albums
John Abercrombie (guitarist) live albums
Lester Bowie live albums
1980 live albums
ECM Records live albums